Gregory's Two Girls is a 1999 Scottish film, set in Cumbernauld and also in various locations in Edinburgh. It is the sequel to Gregory's Girl (1981), which also starred John Gordon Sinclair and Kennie Pullen and was written and directed by Bill Forsyth. The film received mixed reviews.

Plot
Eighteen years after the events of Gregory's Girl, Gregory Underwood (Sinclair), now a 35-year-old English teacher in his former secondary school, has fantasies about 16-year-old student Frances (McKinnon). His politically motivated lessons inspire Frances and Douglas, another student, to plot to overthrow a businessman they suspect of trading in torture equipment.

Cast

Reception
Reviewing the film for The Guardian, Peter Bradshaw said: "This quaint film is from the stable of Forsyth movies such as That Sinking Feeling and Local Hero, and disconcertingly out of its time... all Forsyth's films have charm, including this one. But, unfortunately, Gregory's Two Girls has the unhappy distinction of being an Accidental Period Piece."

However, Time Out London's reviewer said: "There's still comic mileage in Gordon-Sinclair's amiable fumbling Gregory... attention is directed towards wider, broadly political issues, but Forsyth's assured craftsmanship ensures that they are deftly woven into the storytelling. Gordon-Sinclair is a revelation, and although the film suffers from a lack of pace, its wealth of human insight and the premium it places on subtlety of expression make it a rare pleasure.

References

External links

Scotland: the Movie Location Guide

1990s British films
1990s English-language films
1990s high school films
1999 comedy films
1999 films
British high school films
British sequel films
Cumbernauld
English-language Scottish films
Fictional trios
Films about educators
Films directed by Bill Forsyth
Films set in schools
Films set in Scotland
Films shot in Edinburgh
Scottish comedy films